Paisley by-election may refer to one of five parliamentary by-elections held in the constituency of Paisley in Renfrewshire, Scotland:

 1884 Paisley by-election
 1891 Paisley by-election
 1920 Paisley by-election
 1948 Paisley by-election
 1961 Paisley by-election

See also
 Paisley South by-election (disambiguation)